Canada competed at the XI Paralympic Games in Sydney, Australia from October 18 to 29, 2000. The Canadian team included 166 athletes; 113 on foot and 53 on wheelchairs. Canada finished third in the medal table and won a total of ninety-six medals; thirty-eight gold, thirty-three silver and twenty-five bronze.

Swimmer Stephanie Dixon set a Canadian record at the Games for most gold medals at a single Paralympics, Winter or Summer, with 5. The record was later tied by wheelchair racer Chantal Petitclerc in the 2004 Summer Paralympics and skier Lauren Woolstencroft in the 2010 Winter Paralympics.

Medallists

Multi medallists
Lisa Franks: 4 golds, 1 silver (track athletics)
Chantal Petitclerc: 2 golds, 2 silvers (track athletics)
Jeff Adams: 2 golds, 1 silver, 2 bronzes (track athletics)
Jessica Sloan: 6 golds, 1 silver (swimming)
Stephanie Dixon: 5 golds, 1 silver (swimming)
Philippe Gagnon: 3 golds, 1 silver (swimming)
Danielle Campo: 3 golds, 1 silver (swimming)
Elisabeth Walker-Young: 3 golds (swimming)
Benoît Huot: 2 golds, 3 silvers (swimming)
Kirby Cote: 2 golds, 2 silvers (swimming)
Walter Wu: 2 golds, 2 silvers (swimming)

Other athletes
Bold athletes are athletes who have won a medal.

Archery: Alec Denys and Norbert Murphy.
Athletics: André Beaudoin, Andy Shaw, Barry Patriquin, Brent Mcmahon, Caitlin Renneson, Carl Marquis, Chantal Petitclerc, Chelsea Lariviere, Christine Campbell, Clayton Gerein, Colette Bourgonje, Colin Mathieson, Courtney Knight, Dean Bergeron, Diane Roy, Dominique Tremblay, Earle Connor, Eric Gauthier, France Gagne, Greg Dailey, Hal Merrill, Jacques Bouchard, Jacques Martin, James Shaw, Jason Delesalle, Jason Dunkerley, Jason Lachance, Jeff Adams, Joseph Radmore, Kelly Smith, Kris Vriend, Kyle Pettey, Lisa Franks, Ljiljana Ljubisic, Mathieu Blanchette, Mathieu Parent, Peter David Howe, Richard Reelie, Rick Gronman, Robert Hughes, Rob Snoek, Shane Risto, Stephen Ellefson, Stuart McGregor, Tracey Melesko.
Boccia: François Bourbonniere, Lance Cryderman, Paul Gauthier Mirane Lanoix-Boyer, Tammy McLeod, Alison Kabush.
Cycling: Alexandre Cloutier, Brian Cowie, Fabien Bergeron, Gary Longhi, Jean Quevillon, Mathieu Fagnan, Minetaro Van Velzen, Stephane Cote, Yvon Provencher, Julie Cournoyer.
Goalball (Men): Dean Kozak, Eric Houle, Jeff Christy, Rob Christy, Mario Caron.
Goalball (Women): Amy Alsop, Carrie Anton, Contessa Scott, Nancy Morin, Nathalie Chartrand, Viviane Forest.
Judo: Pier Morten, William Morgan
Powerlifting: Yves Bedard, Kenneth Doyle
Sailing: Jamie Whitman, Dan McCoy, Paul Tingley, David Williams, Brian Macdonald.
Volleyball (Men): Chris Rodway, Geoff Hammond, Jason Migchels, Joey Stabner, John Przybyszewski, Jose Rebelo, Larry Matthews, Lawrence Flynn, Mikael Bartholdy, Neil Johnson, Tony Quarin, Wayne Epp
Shooting: Christos Trifonidis, Michael Larochelle, Glenn Mariash,  Karen Van Nest
Swimming: Adam Purdy, Andrew Haley, Benoît Huot, Brad Sales, Brian Hill, Donovan Tildesley, Philippe Gagnon, Robert Penner, Tyler Emmett, Walter Wu, Alexandra Guarascio, Andrea Cole, Anne Polinario, Chelsey Gotell, Danielle Campo, Darda Sales, Elisabeth Walker-Young, Jessica Sloan, Jessica Tuomela, Kirby Cote, Marie Dannhaeuser, Moorea Longstaff, Stephanie Dixon, Tara Carkner.
Table tennis: Martin Pelletier and John MacPherson
Wheelchair basketball (Men): Christopher Stoutenburg, David Durepos, James Borisoff, James Treuer, Jeffrey Dennis, Joey Johnson, Kenneth Hall, Patrick Anderson, Richard A. Peter, Ross Norton, Roy Henderson, Travis Gaertner
Wheelchair basketball (Women): Chantal Benoit, Jennifer Krempien, Joanne Kelly, Kendra Ohama, Linda Kutrowski, Lori Radke, Marni Abbott-Peter, Marnie Peters, Michelle Stilwell, Renee Delcolle, Sabrina Pettinicchi, Tracey Ferguson
Wheelchair fencing:  Carrie Loffree, Sylvie Ruth Morel
Wheelchair rugby (Men): Allan Semeniuk, Christopher Daw, Daniel Paradis, Dany Belanger, Daryl Stubel, David Willsie, Garett Hickling, Ian Chan, Kirby Kranabetter, Martin Larocque, Mike Bacon, Patrice Simard
Wheelchair tennis: Paul Johnson, Colin McKeage, Helene Simard, Yuka Chokyu.

See also
Canada at the Paralympics
Canada at the 2000 Summer Olympics

References

Bibliography

External links
International Paralympic Committee

Nations at the 2000 Summer Paralympics
Paralympics
2000